Marcos Antonio Ricardo da Silva (born 16 January 1986 in São Caetano do Sul) is a Brazilian football (soccer) striker.

Football career
Marcos da Silva started his career at São Caetano, where he was born. He then moved to Santo André, Paulista and Grêmio. He then moved to Slavia Praha youth team. Between 2006 and 2008 Marcos played in Bulgarian side Cherno More Varna. Marcos da Silva held the record for scoring the fastest goal in the A PFG (12 seconds after the start of a match) until he was surpassed by former teammate Miroslav Manolov in March 2012.

References

1986 births
Living people
Brazilian footballers
Association football forwards
Footballers from São Paulo (state)
PFC Cherno More Varna players
Expatriate footballers in Bulgaria
Brazilian expatriate sportspeople in Bulgaria
First Professional Football League (Bulgaria) players